Richard Keene may refer to:
Richard Keene (1825–1894), British photographer
Richard Keene (politician) (born 1957), American politician

See also
Richard Keen, politician
Richard Keen (racing driver)
Richard Keane (disambiguation)